Ronald D. Macfarlane (born February 21, 1933, Buffalo, New York) is distinguished professor of Chemistry at Texas A&M University. In 1991, he received the Inaugural Award of the American Society for Mass Spectrometry's Distinguished Achievement Award.

Early life and education 
 1954 University at Buffalo, New York - B.A. Chemistry
 1957 Carnegie-Mellon University, Pennsylvania - M.S. Chemistry
 1959 Carnegie-Mellon University, Pennsylvania - Ph.D. Chemistry

Research interests 
 Separations Methods for Medical Diagnosis
 Ultra-Sensitive Mass Spectrometry
 Is researching the new methods of Conceptual Learning

Awards 
 Guggenheim Fellowship, 1968
 Distinguished Achievement in Research Award
 ACS Nuclear Chemistry Award
 1990 ASMS Distinguished Contribution in Mass Spectrometry Award

References

Living people
Texas A&M University faculty
Thomson Medal recipients
Mass spectrometrists
21st-century American chemists
University at Buffalo alumni
1933 births